ArtPeople is a Danish arts and entertainment company specializing in book and music publishing and also acting as a booking agency. ArtPeople runs a music company that, among other things, includes the distribution of records/CDs as well as films and DVDs and also runs the book publishers People'sPress and People's Press junior. ArtPeople also operates a business with the provision of lectures and lecturers. ArtPeople was formed by Jan Degner and Jakob Kvist in 2002.

Operations
ArtPeople Musik & DVD department – Publishes and releases recordings through the ArtPeople Record label. It also publishes DVDs etc.
Publishing and booking department including: 
People'sPress – for publishing of books
People'sPressjR (Junior) – for publishing for younger readers and publishing comic books
ArtPeople Booking – booking services for writers, musicians etc.

Record label
The "ArtPeople" record label, a growing part of the group has signed many artists including Rasmus Seebach and his best-selling Rasmus Seebach album that stayed at #1 for a total of 25 weeks on Tracklisten, the official Danish Singles Chart in 2010–2011.

Artists signed (selective)
Lars Ankerstjerne
Ataf Khawaja
Christian Brøns
Jøden
Jooks
Johnson
Karl William
Kidd
Rasmus Seebach
Xander

External links
ArtPeople Official website
Writers and artists
Performing artists 
ArtPeople YouTube site

Danish record labels
Book publishing companies of Denmark
Mass media companies based in Copenhagen
Music publishing companies
Comic book publishing companies of Denmark
Companies based in Copenhagen Municipality